Brian Stuart (born 21 December 1937) is an Australian curler.

At the international level, he is a 1991  curler.

He played for Australia at the 1992 Winter Olympics where curling was a demonstration event. There, the Australian men's team finished in seventh place.

At the national level, he is a 1991 Australian men's champion curler.

Teams and events

References

External links

Australian Curling Federation | Facebook ('Today we look back at the first Australian Men's curling team at the 1992 Winter Olympic Games...")

Living people
1937 births
Sportspeople from Melbourne
Australian male curlers
Curlers at the 1992 Winter Olympics
Olympic curlers of Australia
Pacific-Asian curling champions
Australian curling champions
Place of birth missing (living people)